Silverthorne Lumber Co. v. United States, 251 U.S. 385 (1920), was a U.S. Supreme Court Case in which Silverthorne attempted to evade paying taxes. Federal agents illegally seized tax books from Silverthorne and created copies of the records. The issue in this case is whether or not derivatives of illegal evidence are permissible in court. The ruling, delivered by Oliver Wendell Holmes, Jr., was that to permit derivatives would encourage police to circumvent the Fourth Amendment, so the illegal copied evidence was held tainted and inadmissible. This precedent later became known as the "fruit of the poisonous tree doctrine," and is an extension of the exclusionary rule.

Chief Justice White and Associate Justice Pitney dissented without a written opinion.

See also
List of United States Supreme Court cases, volume 251
Wong Sun v. United States,

Further reading

References

External links
 
 

United States Supreme Court cases
United States Supreme Court cases of the White Court
United States Fourth Amendment case law
1920 in United States case law
Forest products companies of the United States